Clark's Teaberry is a brand of chewing gum. The D. L. Clark Company of Pittsburgh's north side purchased the patent for it from Charles Burke, who experimented with various flavors of chewing gum in the basement of 533 McClintock Ave, Pittsburgh, Pennsylvania. Teaberry is currently manufactured in Morocco by the Gerrit J. Verburg Co.

The gum dates to 1900 but the popularity of Teaberry peaked in the 1960s. It was additionally popularized when Pelican Films (292 Madison Avenue, New York, New York) produced a series of commercials using music from Herb Alpert and the Tijuana Brass. Clark liked "The Mexican Shuffle" from the South of the Border album, and commissioned Herb to rerecord it as "The Teaberry Shuffle". In each commercial, a placid person would unwrap a stick of Clark's Teaberry gum and start chewing it. The chewer would abruptly break into a rapid, energetic dance with distinctive shuffling steps for several seconds, then would just as abruptly return to his or her original activity. For instance, one commercial in the campaign featured a column of marching soldiers: one soldier in the middle of the column chewed the gum and stepped out of the column to dance the Teaberry Shuffle, then resumed his position in the column and fell back into step.

The gum's mintlike flavor recalls that of Gaultheria procumbens, the eastern teaberry, from which it derives its name. The gum is pink in color, individually wrapped in white paper, and wrapped again in a pink teaberry-printed paper.

References

External links 
 1960s Teaberry Gum commercial on YouTube, complete with an English Queen's Guard undertaking the Teaberry Shuffle

Chewing gum
Companies based in Buffalo, New York